An atmospheric diving suit (ADS) is a small one-person articulated submersible which resembles a suit of armour, with elaborate pressure joints to allow articulation while maintaining an internal pressure of one atmosphere. The occupant of an ADS does not need to decompress, and there is no need for special gas mixtures, so there is little danger of decompression sickness or nitrogen narcosis when the ADS is functioning properly. An ADS can permit less skilled swimmers to complete deep dives, albeit at the expense of dexterity.

Atmospheric diving suits in current use include the Newtsuit, Exosuit, Hardsuit and the WASP, all of which are self-contained hard suits that incorporate propulsion units. The Hardsuit is constructed from cast aluminum (forged aluminum in a version constructed for the US Navy for submarine rescue); the upper hull is made from cast aluminum, while the bottom dome is machined aluminum.  The WASP is of glass-reinforced plastic (GRP) body tube construction.

Definition and classification
An atmospheric diving suit is a small one-person submersible with articulated limbs encasing the diver. Water- and pressure-tight joints allow articulation while maintaining an internal pressure of approximately one atmosphere. Mobility may be through thrusters for mid-water operation, though this is not a requirement, and articulated legs may be provided for walking on the substrate.

Thornton (2000) distinguishes an ADS from a submersible in that the ADS has human powered articulated limbs, as opposed to remotely operated articulated limbs. It is not clear whether this would exclude servo-assisted limbs encasing those of the operator, as a powered exoskeleton, but it might be reasonable to include them as atmospheric diving suits.

An atmospheric diving suit may be classified as a manned submersible and a self-propelled, manned, one-atmosphere underwater intervention device, but has also been classified as an atmospheric diving system.

Purpose and requirements 
 
The underwater environment exerts major physiological stresses on the diver, which increase with depth, and appear to impose an absolute limit to diving depth at ambient pressure. An atmospheric diving suit  is a small submersible with a pressure hull which accommodates a single occupant at an internal pressure of about one atmosphere. The provision of hollow arm spaces with pressure resistant joints to carry manually operated manipulators, and usually separate leg spaces, similarly articulated for locomotion, makes a suit resemble a bulky suit of plate armour, or an exoskeleton , with elaborate joint seals to allow articulation while maintaining internal pressure.

An atmospheric diving suit is equipment intended primarily to isolate the occupant from the ambient pressure of the underwater environment, and provide any necessary life-support while the suit is in use. While using the suit, the diver will expect to perform useful work, and get to and from the place where the work is to be done. These functions require sufficient mobility, dexterity and sensory input to do the job, and this will vary depending on the details of the work. Consequently, the work possible in an atmospheric suit is limited by the suit construction. 

Mobility at the surface and on deck can be managed by launch and recovery systems, Mobility underwater generally requires neutral or moderately negative buoyancy, and either the ability to walk or swim, or the use of finely controllable thrusters. Both walking and thruster propulsion have been applied with some success. Swimming has not been effective. 

The dexterity to perform useful work is limited by joint mobility and geometry, inertia, and friction, and has been one of the more difficult engineering challenges. Haptic perception through manipulators is a major limitation on finer control, as the friction of the joints and seals greatly reduces the sensitivity available. 

Operator visual input is relatively easy to provide directly by using transparent viewports. A wide field of view can be achieved simply and structurally effectively by using a transparent partial dome over the diver's head. Close-up views of the manipulators are limited by joint flexibility and geometry of the suit's arms. External sound and temperature perception are greatly attenuated, and there is no sense of touch through the suit. Communications must be provided by technology, as there is normally no-one else in the immediate vicinity.

Design constraints 
The main environmental factors affecting design are the ambient hydrostatic pressure of the maximum operating depth, and ergonomic considerations regarding the potential range of operators. The structure and mechanics of the suit must reliably withstand the external pressure, without collapsing or deforming sufficiently to cause seals to leak or joints to experience excessive friction, and the full range of movement must not change the internal or external displaced volume, as this would have consequences for the amount of force required to move the joints in addition to the friction of the joint seals. Insulation is relatively simple, and can be applied to the inside of the suit and in the form of clothing on the diver. Active heating and cooling are also possible using well established technology. Mass changes can be used to provide initial and emergency buoyancy conditions by way of fixed and ditchable ballast weights.  

Ergonomic considerations include the size and strength of the user. The interior dimensions must fit or be modifiable to fit a reasonable range of operators, and operating forces on joints must be reasonably practicable. The field of vision is constrained by the helmet design or viewport positioning, though closed circuit video can extend it considerably in any direction. General underwater conditions of visibility and water movement must be manageable for the range of conditions in which the suit is expected to be used. Marine thrusters may be mounted on the suit to help with maneuvering and positioning, and sonar and other scanning technologies may help provide an augmented external view.

Hazards and failure modes 
The primary structural failure modes of an ADS are buckling collapse in compression, leaks, and lockup of joints. Leaks and buckling in compression both cause a reduction in buoyancy. Joint leaks and locking of articulating joints may be reversible when pressure is reduced. Electrically ignited fire is also possible.

Systems failures may include loss of power, communications, or propulsion, or life-support systems failure, such as failure of scrubbing the carbon dioxide from the breathing air, or failure of internal temperature control. Recovery from most of these would be by aborting the dive and making an emergency ascent. Bailout to emergency breathing system and ditching of ballast to establish positive buoyancy may be necessary. If the ADS is tethered it can be lifted. The most dangerous consequence is catastrophic leakage, which is likely to be fatal.

History

Early designs 

In 1715, British inventor John Lethbridge constructed a "diving suit".

The first armored suit with real joints, designed as leather pieces with rings in the shape of a spring (also known as accordion joints), was designed by Englishman W. H. Taylor in 1838. The diver's hands and feet were covered with leather. Taylor also devised a ballast tank attached to the suit that could be filled with water to attain negative buoyancy. While it was patented, the suit was never actually produced. It is considered that its weight and bulk would have rendered it nearly immobile underwater.

Lodner D. Phillips designed the first completely enclosed ADS in 1856. His design comprised a barrel-shaped upper torso with domed ends and included ball and socket joints in the articulated arms and legs. The arms had joints at shoulder and elbow, and the legs at knee and hip. The suit included a ballast tank, a viewing port, entrance through a manhole cover on top, a hand-cranked propeller, and rudimentary manipulators at the ends of the arms. Air was to be supplied from the surface via hose. There is no indication, however, Phillips' suit was ever constructed.

The first properly anthropomorphic design of ADS, built by the Carmagnolle brothers of Marseilles, France in 1882, featured rolling convolute joints consisting of partial sections of concentric spheres formed to create a close fit and kept watertight with a waterproof cloth. The suit had 22 of these joints: four in each leg, six per arm, and two in the body of the suit. The helmet had 25 individual  glass viewing ports spaced at the average distance of the human eyes. Weighing , the Carmagnole ADS never worked properly and its joints never were entirely waterproof. It is now on display at the French National Navy Museum in Paris.

Another design was patented in 1894 by inventors John Buchanan and Alexander Gordon from Melbourne, Australia. The construction was based on a frame of spiral wires covered with waterproof material. The design was improved by Alexander Gordon by attaching the suit to the helmet and other parts and incorporating jointed radius rods in the limbs. This resulted in a flexible suit which could withstand high pressure. The suit was manufactured by British firm Siebe Gorman and trialed in Scotland in 1898.

A year later, Harry L. Bowdoin of Bayonne, New Jersey, made an improved ADS with oil-filled rotary joints. The joints use a small duct to the interior of the joint to allow equalization of pressure. The suit was designed to have four joints in each arm and leg, and one joint in each thumb, for a total of eighteen. Four viewing ports and a chest-mounted lamp were intended to assist underwater vision. Unfortunately there is no evidence that Bowdoin's suit was ever built, or that it would have worked if it had been.

Atmospheric diving suits built by German firm Neufeldt and Kuhnke were used during the salvage of gold and silver bullion from the wreck of the British ship SS Egypt, an 8,000 ton P&O liner that sank in May 1922. Leavitt's suit was of his own design and construction. The most innovative aspect of Leavitt's suit was the fact that it was completely self-contained and needed no umbilical, the breathing mixture being supplied from a tank mounted on the back of the suit. The breathing apparatus incorporated a scrubber and an oxygen regulator and could last for up to a full hour.

However, these suits were used by the Germans as armored divers during World War II and were later taken by the Western Allies after the war.

In 1952, Alfred A. Mikalow constructed an ADS employing ball and socket joints, specifically for the purpose of locating and salvaging sunken treasure. Mikalow's suit had various interchangeable instruments which could be mounted on the end of the arms in place of the usual manipulators. It carried seven 90-cubic foot high pressure cylinders to provide breathing gas and control buoyancy. The ballast compartment covered the gas cylinders. For communication, the suit used hydrophones.

The modern suit

Peress' Tritonia

Although various atmospheric suits had been developed during the Victorian era, none of these suits had been able to overcome the basic design problem of constructing a joint which would remain flexible and watertight at depth without seizing up under pressure.

Pioneering British diving engineer, Joseph Salim Peress, invented the first truly usable atmospheric diving suit, the Tritonia, in 1932 and was later involved in the construction of the famous JIM suit. Having a natural talent for engineering design, he challenged himself to construct an ADS that would keep divers dry and at atmospheric pressure, even at great depth. In 1918, Peress began working for WG Tarrant at Byfleet, United Kingdom, where he was given the space and tools to develop his ideas about constructing an ADS. His first attempt was an immensely complex prototype machined from solid stainless steel.

In 1923, Peress was asked to design a suit for salvage work on the wreck of SS Egypt which had sunk in the English Channel. He declined, on the grounds that his prototype suit was too heavy for a diver to handle easily, but was encouraged by the request to begin work on a new suit using lighter materials. By 1929 he believed he had solved the weight problem, by using cast magnesium instead of steel, and had also managed to improve the design of the suit's joints by using a trapped cushion of oil to keep the surfaces moving smoothly. Peress claimed that the Tritonia suit could function at  although this was never proven.

 

In 1930, Peress revealed the Tritonia suit. By May it had completed trials and was publicly demonstrated in a tank at Byfleet. The suit performed perfectly, the joints proving resistant to pressure and moving freely even at depth. The suit was offered to the Royal Navy which turned it down, stating that Navy divers never needed to descend below .

The development in atmospheric pressure suits stagnated in the 1940s through 1960s, as efforts were concentrated on solving the problems of deep diving by dealing with the physiological problems of ambient pressure diving instead of avoiding them by isolating the diver from the pressure. Although the advances in ambient pressure diving (in particular, with scuba gear) were significant, the limitations brought renewed interest to the development of the ADS in the late 1960s.

The JIM suit

The Tritonia suit spent about 30 years in an engineering company's warehouse in Glasgow, where it was discovered, with Peress' help, by two partners in the British firm Underwater Marine Equipment, Mike Humphrey and Mike Borrow, in the mid-1960s. UMEL would later classify Peress' suit as the "A.D.S Type I", a designation system that would be continued by the company for later models. In 1969, Peress was asked to become a consultant to the new company created to develop the JIM suit, named in honour of the diver Jim Jarret.

The first JIM suit was completed in November 1971 and underwent trials aboard  in early 1972. The suit also incorporated a communication link and a jettisonable umbilical connection. The original JIM suit had eight annular oil-supported universal joints, one in each shoulder and lower arm, and one at each hip and knee. The JIM operator received air through an oral/nasal mask that attached to a lung-powered scrubber that had a life support duration of approximately 72 hours. Operations in arctic conditions with water temperatures of −1.7 °C  for over 5 hours were successfully carried out using woolen thermal protection and neoprene boots. In 30 °C water the suit was reported to be uncomfortably hot during heavy work.

 
As technology improved and operational knowledge grew, Oceaneering upgraded their fleet of JIMs. The magnesium construction was replaced with glass-reinforced plastic (GRP) and the single joints with segmented ones, each allowing seven degrees of motion, and when added together giving the operator a very great range of motion. In addition, the four-port domed top of the suit was replaced by a transparent acrylic dome as used on WASP, this allowed the operator a much-improved field of vision. Trials were also carried out by the Ministry of Defence on a flying Jim suit powered from the surface through an umbilical cable. This resulted in a hybrid suit with the ability of working on the sea bed as well as mid water.

In addition to upgrades to the JIM design, other variations of the original suit were constructed. The first, named the SAM Suit (designated A.D.S III), was a completely aluminium model. Attempts were made to limit corrosion by the use of a chromic anodizing coating applied to the arm and leg joints, which gave them an unusual green color. Only three SAM suits would be produced by UMEL before the design was shelved.

WASP

The WASP atmospheric diving system is part way between a one person submersible and an atmospheric diving suit, in that there are articulated arms which contain and are moved by the operator's arms, but the operator's legs are contained in a rigid housing. Mobility is provided by two vertical and two horizontal foot-switch controlled electrical marine thrusters. Operating depth was quoted as 

WASP is transported on a support frame.

Current suits

In 1987, the "Newtsuit" was developed by the Canadian engineer Phil Nuytten, and a version was put into production as the "Hardsuit" by Hardsuits International. Made of wrought aluminium, it had fully articulated joints so the diver can move more easily underwater. The life support system provides 6–8 hours of air, with an emergency back-up supply of an additional 48 hours. The Hardsuit was used to salvage the bell from the wreck of the SS Edmund Fitzgerald in 1995. The latest version of the Hardsuit designed by Oceanworks, the "Quantum 2", uses higher power commercially available ROV thrusters for better reliability and more power as well as an atmospheric monitoring system to monitor the environmental conditions in the cabin. 

A more recent design by Nuytten is the Exosuit, a relatively lightweight and low powered suit intended for marine research. It was first used in 2014 at the Bluewater and Antikythera underwater research expeditions.

The ADS 2000 was developed jointly with OceanWorks International and the US Navy in 1997, as an evolution of the Hardsuit to meet US Navy requirements. The ADS2000 provides increased depth capability for the US Navy's Submarine Rescue Program. Manufactured from forged T6061 aluminum alloy it uses an advanced articulating joint design based on the Hardsuit joints. Additionally, the integrated dual thruster system allows the pilot to navigate easily underwater.

From the project's beginning until 2011, the US navy spent $113 million on the ADS.

See also

References

Further reading

External links 

ADS database in therebreathersite.nl
"Metal Diving Suit Has Lamps and Phone", January 1931, Popular Mechanics
"Robot Diving Ball To Speed Deep Sea Salvage" Popular Mechanics, September 1935
Hard Suit
Historic Armored Suits
Atmospheric suits
US Navy Chief goes to 

Diving environmental protection equipment
Environmental suits